Kesariya or Kesaria is a town in the district of East Champaran, in the Indian state of  Bihar. It is the site of a stupa built by the Mauryan king Ashoka.

Geography 
It is near Rampur Khajuria. The nearest villages are Noori Mohalla Trilokwa & Trilokwa (3.5 km),Kushar Saikh Toli (4 km), Phultakiya (3 km), Baisakhawa (2 km), Ramgadhwa (4 km), Tajpur (6 km), Bairiya (6 km), Bathana (5 km), Nyagaw (4 km).There are also two mosques in the town and nearest railway Station is Chakia about 21 km.

History
Modern Kesaria presently stands on the spot of ancient Kesaputta, which was the capital of the Kālāmas, an ancient tribe organised as a republic that was later annexed by its monarchical neighbour Kosala. The Mahaparinibbana Sutta of the Pali Canon contains references to Kesaputta or Bhoganagara. Bhoganagara was situated on the border between the Lichhavis and the Mallas.

Legend
Alara Kalama, Buddha's teacher before enlightenment, is said to have been from Kesaputta. According to Jataka tales, the Buddha ruled this place as a Chakravartin Raja in a previous life. During one of the Buddha's visits to Kesaputta, he gave an essential discourse, the celebrated Kesamutti Sutta, also known as the Kalama Sutta.

The local people call this Stupa Devala, meaning "the house of God." Before the excavation of this, they believed that inside it there is a temple of Shiva which was built by King Bhema containing a lot of treasures.

Kesariya Stupa

Initially constructed as a mud stupa, it gained its present structure in the Maurya, Sunga and Kushana period. The stupa dates between 200 AD and 750 AD and may have been associated with the 4th-century ruler, Raja Chakravarti. Kesariya Stupa is 104 feet high.

Huien Tsang mentions having seen the grand Stupa in Kia-shi-po-lo (Kesariya) but it was deserted and overgrown.

The Kesariya stupa was discovered in 1958 during an excavation led by Archaeologist KK Muhammed of Archaeological Survey of India (ASI).

A 1998 excavation of the area surrounding the stupa uncovered significant items, such as Islamic coins, arrowheads, copper and terracotta items, earthen lamps, decorated bricks, etc. Some images of Buddha, in ‘Bhoomi Sparsh Mudra’ and other sitting postures, were found.

Transport
Transport and accommodation are available from the state capital, Patna, for visit to the Bodh circuit (Bodhgaya, Rajgir,  Nalanda, Vaishali, Kesaria, Mehsi, Lumbini, Kushinagar,  Sarnath), Jain Circuit (Rajgir, Pawapuri), and Sikh Circuit in Bihar.

Climate

References

External links
Bharat Online.com

Buddhist pilgrimage sites in India
Archaeological sites in Bihar
Tourism in Bihar